Sister Madeleine Juneau,  (10 November 1945 – 26 June 2020) was a Canadian museologist and teacher. A Roman Catholic nun, she was a member of the Congregation of Notre Dame of Montreal. Juneau was the recipient of the Medal of the Quebec National Assembly (2011), Thomas-Baillargé award from the Ordre des architectes du Québec, awarded jointly with the Congrégation de Notre-Dame (2012), Queen Elizabeth II Diamond Jubilee Medal (2012), and the Officer of the Order of Montreal (2019)

Biography
Madeleine Juneau was born in Saint-Augustin-de-Desmaures, 10 November 1945. She had two sister and seven brothers.

In 1966, she became a religious of the Congregation of Notre-Dame. She taught in Montreal and then, from 1972 to 1982, in Hearst, Ontario. From 1984 to 1997, she was the director of educational services at Maison Saint-Gabriel in Montreal, a historic site owned by this religious community. She became its Executive Director in 1997.

Open to the public since 1966, Maison Saint-Gabriel was primarily an interpretation center for the work of the Sisters of the Congregation of Notre Dame. In the early 1990s, Maison Saint-Gabriel welcomed some 6,000 visitors per year. It has become a place of interpretation of rural life in New France where the King's Daughters are highlighted as well as the cultural landscape (housing, cooking, daily life). In 1998, the number of visitors increased to 35,000. Various popular education initiatives were added: creation of a historical spice trail, reconstitution of a 17th century apothecary's garden, organization of auctions on the premises, recitation of tales, presentation of and lectures in a tavern. Presently, the site attracts more than 75,000 visitors per year. Classified as a historic monument in 1965, the House was designated a National Historic Site by the Historic Sites and Monuments Board of Canada in 2007. It received six  in 1999, 2003, 2005, 2007, 2009 and 2010 in the category of Tourist Attraction of less than 100,000 visitors, in the Montreal region. 

Juneau has served on the boards of directors of the Regroupement économique et social du Sud-Ouest, the Chambre de commerce du Sud-Ouest de Montréal, and the Société historique de Pointe-Saint-Charles. She was also a member of the board of directors of the Association du tourisme religieux et spirituel du Québec, founded in December 2018.

She died in Verdun on 26 June 2020, aged 74.

Awards and honours
In 2013, Juneau received the Prix Gérard-Morisset, one of 14 annual prizes awarded by the Government of Quebec in recognition of an outstanding career in the scientific and cultural fields. This award was given to her in recognition of the role within Maison Saint-Gabriel, in the conservation of its architectural and historical heritage, and in the knowledge of Montreal's heritage. On November 28, 2016, Juneau received from David Johnston, Governor General of Canada, the Governor General's History Award for Excellence in Museum Programs - Living History! for her exhibition "The Canadian Horse, a breed apart", presented at Maison Saint-Gabriel in 2015 on the occasion of the 350th anniversary of the Canadian horse. On June 22, 2017 in Quebec City, Premier of Quebec Philippe Couillard decorated her as a Knight of the National Order of Quebec, and the following day, June 23, at Rideau Hall in Ottawa, she received the Meritorious Service Cross - Civil Division from David Johnston, which recognizes an action that has been performed with exceptional professionalism and from which Canada has benefited significantly.

References

1945 births
2020 deaths
People from Capitale-Nationale
Museologists
Canadian women academics
Place of death missing
French Quebecers
20th-century Canadian nuns
21st-century Canadian nuns
Knights of the National Order of Quebec